The Plaza Hotel, formerly the Hilton Hotel, is a landmark skyscraper located at 106 Mills Avenue in El Paso, Texas, USA.

History
The hotel was constructed on the site of the Sheldon Hotel, which burned down on April 9, 1929. The Sheldon served as the unofficial headquarters for many of the participants in the Mexican Revolution (1910-1920s) from both sides of the border.

In the fall of 1929, Conrad Hilton began construction. Nineteen days later the stock market crashed and the Great Depression began, yet construction continued. On November 30, 1930, the Hilton Hotel opened. At 239 feet (73 m) it surpassed the O. T. Bassett Tower to become the tallest building in El Paso; it is still the city's fifth tallest building. Designed by Trost & Trost, the hotel is an Art Deco styled 19-story reinforced cast-in-place concrete structure with setbacks at the 16th and 17th floors. It is faced with brown brick and concrete and crowned with a Ludowici clay tile pyramidal roof. The exterior remains largely unaltered from its original form. 

Conrad Hilton lived in the hotel for many years, as did his mother.  Elizabeth Taylor, at the time married to Conrad’s son, Nicky Hilton, lived in the penthouse in 1955 while filming the classic movie Giant (1956).

Hilton sold the hotel in 1963, and it was renamed the Plaza Hotel. The hotel closed in 1991. In 2008, El Paso businessman Paul Foster purchased the property. In 2019 it was renovated at a cost of $78 million. The architecture firm for this renovation was Cooper Carry. It reopened in June 2020 as The Plaza Hotel Pioneer Park.

Historical markers
Historical markers located on the Plaza Hotel include the First Kindergarten in Texas and The Woman’s Club of El Paso. Historical markers located in the vicinity of the hotel include Chinatown and the Anson Mills Building. Both markers are located across Mills Avenue at El Paso Street.

About the hotel

The Plaza hotel has 130 rooms with an adjacent car parking garage.

Gallery

See also

National Register of Historic Places listings in El Paso County, Texas

References

External links

 The Plaza Hotel Pioneer Park official website

Skyscrapers in El Paso, Texas
Plaza Hotel (El Paso)
Plaza Hotel (El Paso)
Plaza Hotel (El Paso)
Plaza Hotel (El Paso)
National Register of Historic Places in El Paso County, Texas
Economy of El Paso, Texas
Skyscraper hotels in Texas
Art Deco architecture in Texas
Hotel buildings completed in 1930
Hotel buildings on the National Register of Historic Places in Texas